Stav Shushan (born May 14, 1995) is an Israeli footballer.

Club career
Shushan started playing at the age of 9 with Hapoel Jerusalem, before moving to play for Beitar Jerusalem and Hapoel Rishon LeZion youth teams. Shushan made his debut in the Youth Premier League in October 2011 with Hapoel Rishon LeZion, and between 2012 and 2015 played 42 more matches in the Youth Premier League with Beitar Jerusalem. In 2015 Shushan was promoted to the senior squad as a second goalkeeper, and made his debut in the Israeli Premier League on 9 May 2016, in a match against Hapoel Be'er Sheva, replacing first choice goalkeeper Boris Klaiman, who was sent off at the end of the previous match.
On May 22, 2018 Shushan left Beitar Jerusalem.

Shushan was part of the U-19 national team squad to the 2014 U-19 Championship, but didn't play, as goalkeeper Dean Gal played all three matches in the championship.

References

1995 births
Living people
Israeli footballers
Israeli Jews
Beitar Jerusalem F.C. players
Israeli Premier League players
Footballers from Jerusalem
Association football goalkeepers